This list of Florida Gators football All-Americans includes those members of the Florida Gators football team who have received All-American honors from one or more selector organizations.  The Florida Gators represent the University of Florida in the sport of American football, and they compete in the Football Bowl Subdivision (FBS) of the National Collegiate Athletic Association (NCAA) and the Eastern Division of the Southeastern Conference (SEC).

Several selector organizations release annual lists of their All-America teams after each college football season, honoring the best players at each position.  Selector organizations include football analysts, television networks, publications, media wire services, sports writers' associations, and coaches' associations.  Traditionally, several of the selectors have recognized two or more tiers of All-Americans, referred to as the first team, second team, third team and honorable mentions.

The NCAA currently recognizes the All-America teams of five selector organizations to determine "consensus All-Americans" and "unanimous All-Americans" in college football.  The NCAA compiles consensus All-Americans using a point system based on the All-America teams from the five selector organizations.  The point system consists of three points for a first-team selection, two points for a second-team selection, and one point for a third-team selection; no points are awarded for honorable mention selections.  Since 1993, the NCAA-recognized selectors have included the American Football Coaches Association (AFCA), the Associated Press (AP), the Football Writers Association of America (FWAA), The Sporting News (SN), and the Walter Camp Football Foundation (WCFF), but the number of selectors used by the NCAA has varied over time, and has included different organizations in the past.  The players receiving the most points at each position are recognized as consensus All-Americans; in order for a player to receive unanimous All-American recognition, he must be a first-team selection by all of the NCAA-recognized selector organizations.

Since the Florida Gators football team played its first season in 1906, eighty-nine Gators football players have received one or more selections as first-team All-Americans.  Included among these players are thirty-three consensus All-Americans, of which eight were also unanimous All-Americans.  The first Florida player to be recognized as a first-team All-American was end Dale Van Sickel, a member of the great Gators eleven of 1928.  Florida's first consensus All-American was quarterback Steve Spurrier, who was the winner of the Heisman Trophy in 1966.

Key

Selectors

Selections

See also 

 Florida Gators
 History of the University of Florida
 List of Florida Gators in the NFL Draft
 List of Florida Gators head football coaches
 List of University of Florida Athletic Hall of Fame members
 University Athletic Association

References

Bibliography 

  2012 Florida Gators Football Media Guide, University Athletic Association, Gainesville, Florida (2012).
 2012 NCAA Football Records Book,  Award Winners, National Collegiate Athletic Association, Indianapolis, Indiana (2012).
 Carlson, Norm, University of Florida Football Vault: The History of the Florida Gators, Whitman Publishing, LLC, Atlanta, Georgia (2007).  .
 Golenbock, Peter, Go Gators!  An Oral History of Florida's Pursuit of Gridiron Glory, Legends Publishing, LLC, St. Petersburg, Florida (2002).  .
 Hairston, Jack, Tales from the Gator Swamp: A Collection of the Greatest Gator Stories Ever Told, Sports Publishing, LLC, Champaign, Illinois (2002).  .
 Kabat, Ric A., "Before the Seminoles: Football at Florida State College, 1902–1904," Florida Historical Quarterly, vol. LXX, no. 1 (July 1991).
 MacCambridge, Michael, ed., ESPN College Football Encyclopedia: The Complete History of the Game, ESPN, New York, New York (2005).  .
 McCarthy, Kevin M.,  Fightin' Gators: A History of University of Florida Football, Arcadia Publishing, Mount Pleasant, South Carolina (2000).  .
 McEwen, Tom, The Gators: A Story of Florida Football, The Strode Publishers, Huntsville, Alabama (1974).  .
 Nash, Noel, ed., The Gainesville Sun Presents The Greatest Moments in Florida Gators Football, Sports Publishing, Inc., Champaign, Illinois (1998).  .
 Proctor, Samuel, & Wright Langley, Gator History: A Pictorial History of the University of Florida, South Star Publishing Company, Gainesville, Florida (1986).  .

 
Lists of college football All-Americans
football All-Americans